Geocoris megacephalus is a species of big-eyed bug in the family Geocoridae, found in the Palearctic.

Subspecies
These six subspecies belong to the species Geocoris megacephalus:
 Geocoris megacephalus mediterraneus Puton, 1878
 Geocoris megacephalus megacephalus (Rossi, 1790)
 Geocoris megacephalus occipitalis (Dufour *, 1857)
 Geocoris megacephalus puberulus Montandon, 1907
 Geocoris megacephalus siculus (Fieber, 1844)
 Geocoris megacephalus villosulus Montandon, 1907

References

External links

 

Lygaeoidea